Based in Chicago, Illinois, The Lakeside Singers is a Chicago area ensemble made up of professional singers, composers and arrangers, half of whom have the majority of their performing experience in classical choral music and half in non-classical styles. Individually, they have performed in TV and radio commercials, operas, early music ensembles, film scores, Broadway shows, jazz clubs, cruise ships, cabarets and classical and popular concerts across the country. The Lakeside Singers was founded in the fall of 1999 by Artistic Director Robert Bowker and Executive Director Mary Stewart.

The Lakeside Singers typical concert format involves a classical sound during the first half of the concert and the same group of singers at microphones in front of a live band for the second half. The Lakeside Singers typically present a Spring and Christmas Concert series as well as appearing at other public and private events. During their 2008 season they were featured with the Chicago Symphony Orchestra at Ravinia Festival and made their debut at the Harris Theater in Chicago's Millennium Park.

The Lakeside Singers are headquartered in Evanston, Illinois and operate under the leadership of Robert Bowker, a singer, conductor, composer, arranger and producer. Individuals must audition for acceptance to the group and must re-audition every two years.

Sources
 Lakeside Singers Official site
 Lakeside Singers on MySpace
 Robert Bowker Official site
 CenterStage Chicago Listing
 Splash Magazine Review
 Audio Interview and Review on NPR Affiliate WBEZ, Chicago Public Radio Show Eight-Forty Eight

Musical groups from Chicago
Choirs in Illinois
Musical groups established in 1999
1999 establishments in Illinois